Richard Lyman may refer to:

Richard R. Lyman (1870–1963), American apostle of The Church of Jesus Christ of Latter-day Saints
Richard Wall Lyman (1923–2012), American academic, president of Stanford University
Richard M. Lyman, member of the California legislature

See also
Richard Lyman Bushman (born 1931), American historian